Şehitler is an underground rapid transit station of the Ankara Metro. The station was opened on 5 January 2017, the same day the M4 line opened which is also one of the terminus stations of the line.

Platform Structure

References

External links
EGO Ankara - Official website

Railway stations opened in 2017
Ankara metro stations
2014 establishments in Turkey
Transit centers in Ankara